Christopher Spencer may refer to:

 Christopher Miner Spencer (1833–1922), American inventor
 Cold War Steve, the nom de plume of Christopher Spencer, British collage artist and satirist